Wedding in Transit is a 1953 West German comedy film directed by Paul Verhoeven and starring Gardy Granass, Karlheinz Böhm and Gert Fröbe.

It was made at the Wandsbek Studios in Hamburg. Location shooting took place in a variety of places including Munich, Lausanne in Switzerland and Elche, Granada and Madrid in Spain. The film's sets were designed by the art director Mathias Matthies.

Cast
 Gardy Granass as Ilse Delius
 Karlheinz Böhm as Dr. Walter Delius
 Susi Nicoletti as Ly Ballacz
 Paul Klinger as Herr von Rupp
 Gert Fröbe as Herr Mengwasser
 Walter Gross as Gabor
 Ilse Bally as Anna Delius
 Walter Janssen as Professor Schmidt
 Günther Jerschke as Reiseteilnehmer
 Doris Kiesow as Frau Montez
 Erwin Linder as Alterer Anwalt
 Doris Rath as Reiseteilnehmerin
 Joachim Teege as Junger Anwalt

References

Bibliography 
 Jill Nelmes & Jule Selbo. Women Screenwriters: An International Guide. Palgrave Macmillan, 2015.

External links 
 

1953 films
West German films
German comedy films
1953 comedy films
1950s German-language films
Films based on works by Heinrich Spoerl
Films directed by Paul Verhoeven (Germany)
German black-and-white films
Films shot at Wandsbek Studios
1950s German films